is a former professional baseball player in Japan's Nippon Professional Baseball, and a politician. A right-handed pitcher, in  he was voted into the Japanese Baseball Hall of Fame.

Baseball career 

Horiuchi played for the Yomiuri Giants his whole career, from 1966–1983; he was an integral part of the team's ten Japan Series championships during that period (including nine in a row).

His first season he went 16-2 with a league-leading 1.39 earned run average, winning both the Eiji Sawamura Award and the Central League Rookie of the Year award. He led the league in winning percentage and also in most bases on balls allowed.

He led the league in winning percentage again in 1967, going 12-2 to post an amazing two-year stretch of 28-4. That year he also threw a no-hitter, against the Hiroshima Carp. The next three seasons were all successful. but he again led the league in walks all three years. (Horiuchi also gave up 31 home runs in 1968 to lead the league.)

1972 was Horiuchi's finest season, as he went 26-9 with a 2.91 ERA and 26 complete games, again winning the Eiji Sawamura Award (this despite the fact he led the league in hits and home runs allowed). That year he also won the Central League MVP.

In 1974 Horiuchi led the Central League in complete games with 21.

Horiuchi finished his career with 203 wins, earning him a spot in Meikyukai.

He managed the Yomiuri Giants in 2004–2005 (the team went 133-144 under his leadership). He has also acted as a TV analyst for Giants broadcasts.

Politics
Horiuchi stood as a candidate of the House of Councillors election, 2010 for the LDP but lost. Receiving 101,840 preference votes nationwide, he ranked 13th on the LDP list – the party received only twelve proportional seats – and was thus the top replacement candidate for a possible kuriage-tōsen, i.e. the first candidate to be elected without an additional vote if an LDP proportional seat in the 2010 class of Councillors fell vacant. As a result, he became a member of the House of Councillors in the proportional representation segment of the class of 2010 in August 2013 as the replacement for Hirohiko Nakamura, who died on July 31, 2013.

Statistics

References

External links
 

Living people
1948 births
People from Yamanashi Prefecture
Japanese baseball players
Yomiuri Giants players
Nippon Professional Baseball Rookie of the Year Award winners
Nippon Professional Baseball MVP Award winners
Managers of baseball teams in Japan
Yomiuri Giants managers
Liberal Democratic Party (Japan) politicians
Japanese sportsperson-politicians
Members of the House of Councillors (Japan)
Japanese Baseball Hall of Fame inductees
People from Kōfu, Yamanashi